Cagles Mill Lake, also known as Cataract Lake, is a reservoir located near Cataract, Indiana in Lieber State Recreation Area, in west central Indiana on the borders of Putnam and Owen counties. It is alimented from the north by Mill Creek and drains out through to the Eel River to its south, which then makes its way to the White River. Indiana State Road 42 once went through where Cataract Lake is now and currently has a new, entirely different route on the upper area from its original route.

Located on the lake are the state's largest waterfalls, the Cataract Falls. A main attraction to tourists on the lake is a bald eagle's nest, where the birds return every season.

Cagles Mill Dam is a flood control project of the United States Army Corps of Engineers, an earthen dam completed in 1953.  It impounds a maximum capacity of 228,120 acre-feet, and normal storage of 27,112 acre-feet.

References

External links
Indiana Department of Natural Resources: Cagles Mill Lake State Reservoir - official site
National Weather Service hydrographic information
Images
Fishing report
U.S. Army Corps of Engineers: Cagles Mill Lake
Great Lakes Gateway

Dams completed in 1953
Bodies of water of Owen County, Indiana
Bodies of water of Putnam County, Indiana
Dams in Indiana
United States Army Corps of Engineers dams
Protected areas of Owen County, Indiana
Reservoirs in Indiana
Nature centers in Indiana